Victor Alfred Knox (January 13, 1899 – December 13, 1976) was a politician from the U.S. state of Michigan. He served six terms in the United States House of Representatives from 1953 to 1965.

Early life and education
Knox was born on a farm in Chippewa County, Michigan, near Sault Ste. Marie; his father was from Canada. He attended the public schools and engaged in farming until 1943. He was the treasurer of Soo Township in 1923 and 1924, and Chippewa County supervisor, 1925-1931. Knox was member of the Michigan House of Representatives, 1937–1952, serving as the speaker pro tempore and Republican floor leader, 1943–1946, and as speaker, 1947-1952. He was also the manager of the Chippewa County Farm Bureau, 1943–1946 and engaged in the retail plumbing and heating business in Sault Ste. Marie in 1946. He served on the Council of State Government, the State Planning Commission, the State Crime Commission, and the Soo Locks Centennial Commission.

Congress
Knox was elected as a Republican from Michigan's 11th congressional district to the 83rd United States Congress and to the five succeeding Congresses, serving from January 3, 1953 to January 3, 1965. Knox voted in favor of the Civil Rights Acts of 1957 and 1960, but voted against the Civil Rights Act of 1964, as well as the 24th Amendment to the U.S. Constitution. He was an unsuccessful candidate for reelection in 1964, losing in the general election to Democrat Raymond F. Clevenger.

Death
Knox died in Petoskey, Michigan and is interred at Oaklawn Chapel Gardens, fifteen miles south of Sault Ste. Marie.

References

The Political Graveyard

External links 
 

1899 births
1976 deaths
20th-century American politicians
American people of Canadian descent
Republican Party members of the United States House of Representatives from Michigan
Burials in Michigan
County commissioners in Michigan
Speakers of the Michigan House of Representatives
People from Sault Ste. Marie, Michigan